Kenny Park, also known as Park Eun-kwan, is a South Korean businessman. He is the founder and CEO of Simone Accessory, a handbag and accessories manufacturer.

Early life
In 1978, Park earned a degree in German and literature from Yonsei University.

Career
Park started making handbags for Donna Karan in 1987, and Simone Accessory now makes bags for other brands including Michael Kors, Kate Spade, Coach New York, Marc Jacobs, Tory Burch, Ralph Lauren, DVF, Alexander Wang, Phillip Lim, Proenza Schouler, Versus Versace, and AllSaints. Simone manufactures 30 million handbags and leather goods annually.

In 2015, Blackstone Group acquired a 30% stake in Simone for $300 million.

Park owns 62% of the company. In March 2018, Park became a billionaire.

Simone also operates multiple financial management and advisory companies including Simone Investment, a private equity firm and other real estate development funds.

Personal life
Park is married, with two children, and lives in Seoul. Park's daughter, Joowon Park, heads subsidiary Simone Fashion Co., which runs stores for German designer Karl Lagerfeld and Simone's own brand 0914. Joowon is also a founder of a concept store Adekuver, and is one of the most influential figures among K-pop idol fashion stylists. She was the youngest speaker at the 2016 Conde Nast Luxury conference held in Seoul and hosted by Suzy Menkes.

References

1950s births
Living people
Yonsei University alumni
South Korean chief executives
South Korean company founders
Former billionaires